Malcolm Warren Rush (April 2, 1909 – January 1, 1989) was an American professional basketball player. He played for the Akron Goodyear Wingfoots in the National Basketball League in 1937–38. He played college basketball, baseball, football, track, and tennis at Bethany College in Bethany, West Virginia. After his professional basketball career, Rush stayed with Goodyear Aerospace for over 40 more years.

References

1909 births
1989 deaths
Akron Goodyear Wingfoots players
American men's basketball players
Basketball players from Ohio
Bethany Bison baseball players
Bethany Bison football players
Bethany Bison men's basketball players
Forwards (basketball)
People from Salem, Ohio